The 1999–2000 Seton Hall Pirates men's basketball team represented Seton Hall University as a member of the Big East Conference during the 1999–2000 NCAA men's college basketball season. Led by head coach Tommy Amaker, the team played their home games at Continental Airlines Arena in East Rutherford, New Jersey. The Pirates received an at-large bid to the NCAA tournament as No. 10 seed in the East region. After an opening round win over Oregon in overtime, Seton Hall upset No. 2 seed Temple to reach the Sweet Sixteen. The run would come to an end in the Regional semifinal as No. 3 seed Oklahoma State eliminated the Pirates, 68–66. The team finished the season with a record of 22–10 (10–6 Big East).

Roster

Schedule and results

|-
!colspan=9 style=| Regular season

|-
!colspan=9 style=| Big East Tournament

|-
!colspan=9 style=| NCAA Tournament

Rankings

References

External links 

Seton Hall Pirates men's basketball seasons
Seton Hall
Seton Hall
Seton Hall
Seton Hall